Svietlahorsk Rajon, Svietlahorski Rajon is a district of Gomel Region, in Belarus.

Twin towns
 Bielsk Podlaski, Poland

Notable residents 

 Ihar Hermianchuk (1961, Strakavičy village – 2002), prominent Belarusian journalist and political activist

 Ściapan Niekraševič (1983, the estate of Daniłoŭka - 1937), Belarusian academic, political figure and a victim of Stalin’s purges

References

 
Districts of Gomel Region